The Chaotianmen Bridge, is a road-rail bridge over the Yangtze River in the city of Chongqing, China. The bridge, which opened on 29 April 2009, is the world's longest through arch bridge.

It carries six lanes of traffic with a pedestrian walkway on each side on the upper deck. The lower deck has 2 traffic lanes on each side with the Chongqing Metro Loop Line running down the middle.

See also

 Yangtze River bridges and tunnels
 List of longest arch bridge spans

References

External links
 

Bridges completed in 2009
Bridges in Chongqing
Arch bridges in China
Bridges over the Yangtze River
Through arch bridges in China
Steel bridges in China
Road-rail bridges in China